Nathan Leroy Strong (November 12, 1859 – December 14, 1939) was a Republican member of the U.S. House of Representatives from Pennsylvania.

Nathan L. Strong was born in Troy (now Summerville), Jefferson County, Pennsylvania. He worked as a telegraph operator and railroad agent from 1877 to 1894. He studied law, was admitted to the bar in 1891 and commenced practice in Brookville, Pennsylvania, in 1893. He served as district attorney of Jefferson County from 1895 to 1900. He was engaged in the development of mineral lands in Jefferson and Armstrong Counties from 1901 to 1916, and served a president of the Mohawk Mining Company. He was also engaged in banking.

Strong was elected as a Republican to the Sixty-fifth and to the eight succeeding Congresses. He was an unsuccessful candidate for reelection in 1934. After he left Congress, he resumed his former business activities, and died in Brookville. Interment in Brookville Cemetery.

Sources

The Political Graveyard

1859 births
1939 deaths
Republican Party members of the United States House of Representatives from Pennsylvania